Hurley Medical Center is a teaching hospital serving Genesee, Lapeer, and Shiawassee counties in eastern Michigan since December 19, 1908.  Situated in Flint, Michigan, it is a 457-bed public non-profit hospital.

The emergency department is an ACS verified Level I Trauma Center and Level II Pediatric Trauma Center. Hurley also has region's only Children's Hospital, Burn Unit, Neonatal Intensive Care Unit, Pediatric Intensive Care Unit, and Pediatric Emergency Department.

History
James J. Hurley, an English immigrant, arrived in Flint penniless and worked his way up from a hotel porter to making a fortune from sawmills and soap. Remembering his early days of poverty when his wife struggled through a serious illness, Hurley donated $55,000 and land for a public hospital to the city of Flint. Hurley Hospital opened on December 19, 1908, as a 40-bed hospital with 8 nurses.

Affiliations
It is affiliated with the medical schools of Michigan State University and University of Michigan. It is also affiliated with nursing schools of the University of Michigan–Flint and Mott Community College.

External links
Hurley Medical Center website

References

Hospital buildings completed in 1908
Hospitals in Michigan
Buildings and structures in Flint, Michigan
Hospitals established in 1908
1908 establishments in Michigan
Trauma centers